The St. Louis Slam is a women's professional American football team based in St. Louis, Missouri. They play in the Pro Division of the Women's Football Alliance (WFA). Home games are played at Harlen C. Hunter Stadium on the campus of Lindenwood University in St. Charles, MO.  The team is coached by Quincy Davis.

The Slam played in the National Women's Football Association from their inception in 2003 until 2008. In 2009 they joined WFA. On August 15, 2009, the Slam won the first Women's Football Alliance league championship game, defeating the West Michigan Mayhem 21–14 at Pan American Stadium in New Orleans, Louisiana. They won three more championships while competing in Division 2 of the WFA (2016, 2017, 2019). In 2021, they elevated to the Pro Division of the WFA — the most competitive field of teams in the sport women's football.

Season-By-Season

|-
| colspan="6" align="center" | St. Louis Slam (NWFA)
|-
|2003 || 3 || 5 || 0 || 3rd Midwest Division || –
|-
|2004 || 5 || 3 || 0 || 2nd South Midwest || –
|-
|2005 || 5 || 3 || 0 || 7th North Division || –
|-
|2006 || 6 || 2 || 0 || 1st South Central || Won NWFA first round (Kentucky)Lost NWFA Quarterfinal (Massachusetts Mutiny)
|-
|2007 || 7 || 1 || 0 || 1st South North || Won Southern Conference Quarterfinals (Phoenix)Lost Southern Conference Semifinals (Oklahoma City)
|-
|2008 || 8 || 0 || 0 || 1st South Midwest || First-round bye for Southern Conference QuarterfinalsLost Southern Conference Semifinals (H-Town)
|-
| colspan="6" align="center" | St. Louis Slam (WFA)
|-
|2009 || 8 || 0 || 0 || 1st American Midwest Division || Won American Conference Semifinal (Las Vegas)Won American Conference Championship (Jacksonville)Won WFA national championship (West Michigan)
|-
|2010 || 8 || 0 || 0 || 1st National Central Division || Won National Conference Quarterfinal (Cleveland)Won National Conference Semifinal (Jacksonville)Lost National Conference Championship (Columbus)
|-
|2011 || 5 || 3 || 0 || 2nd National Central Division || –
|-
|2012 || 5 || 3 || 0 || 2nd American Division 11 || Won Midwest Regional Quarterfinal (Minnesota)Lost Midwest Regional semifinal (Kansas City Titans)
|-
|2013 || 5 || 3 || 0 || 1st American Great Plains Division || Won Midwest Regional Quarterfinal (Acadiana Zydeco) Won Midwest Regional semifinal (Kansas City Titans) Lost Midwest Regional Final (Dallas Diamonds)
|-
|2014 || 0 || 0 || 0 || colspan="2" | Inactive
|-
|2015 || 6 || 2 || 0 || 1st American Great Plains Division || Lost Conference Quarterfinal (Dallas Elite)
|-
|2016 || 4 || 2 || 0 || 1st American Conference (Tier 2) || Won Conference Quarterfinal (Houston Power)Won Conference Semifinal (Sin City Trojans)Won Division 2 Championship (Tampa Bay)
|-
|2017 || 7 || 1 || 0 || 1st American Conference (Tier 2) || Won Conference Quarterfinal (Madison Blaze)Won Conference Semifinal (Mile High Blaze)Won Division 2 Championship (Tampa Bay)
|-
|2018 || 0 || 0 || 0 || colspan="2" | Inactive
|-
|2019 || 8 || 0 || 0 || 1st American Conference (Tier 2) || Won Conference Quarterfinal (Minnesota)Won Conference Semifinal (Mile High Blaze)Won Division 2 Championship (Detroit)
|-
|2020 || 0 || 0 || 0 || colspan="2" | Season cancelled (COVID-19) 
|-
|2021 || 0 || 0 || 0 || colspan="2" | Inactive 
|-
|2022 || 0 || 0 || 0 || * || 
|-
!Totals || 106 || 35 || 0
|colspan="2"| (including playoffs)

* = Current standing

2009

Season schedule

2010

Season schedule

2011

Standings

Season schedule

** = Won by forfeit

2012

Season schedule

2016

Season schedule

2017

Season schedule

External links
St. Louis Slam official website

National Women's Football Association teams
American football teams in St. Louis
Women's Football Alliance teams
American football teams established in 2003
2003 establishments in Missouri
Women's sports in Missouri